Philip Turbett (born 15 June 1961 in Omagh, Northern Ireland) is a British bassoonist and clarinettist also specialising in historically informed performance.

Orchestral career 
Turbett has been a bassoonist with Orchestra of the Age of Enlightenment, the English Baroque Soloists, the Orchestre Révolutionnaire et Romantique, the Academy of Ancient Music, the New Queen's Hall Orchestra and the London Classical Players. He has worked with many other leading orchestras including the London Philharmonic Orchestra, the Philharmonia, English National Ballet, the Hanover Band, London Baroque, Collegium Musicum 90, The English Concert and many other freelance orchestras. He has appeared on hundreds recordings, of which many have received awards from the music industry.

He has worked with conductors including Sir Simon Rattle, Sir Charles Mackerras, Sir Roger Norrington, Sir Andrew Davis, Sir John Eliot Gardiner, Sir Neville Marriner, Sir Mark Elder, Frans Brüggen, Vladimir Jurowski, Edward Gardner, Paul Daniel, and Daniel Harding.

His work has taken him to Australia, Japan, America, South America, Canada, Korea, Taiwan, Hong Kong and all the major European cities. He has performed at all the major concert halls across the world including the Sydney Opera House, Carnegie Hall (New York), the Lincoln Center for the Performing Arts (New York), Symphony Hall (Boston) and Symphony Center (Chicago), Suntory Hall (Tokyo), and all the major European venues. Turbett has also performed regularly at London's Southbank Centre, the Barbican Centre, the Royal Festival Hall, annually at Glyndebourne Opera House, the BBC Proms, the Edinburgh International Festival and other major UK festivals.

Turbett has often appeared and played on television, such as the BBC's Millennium Concert from Ely Cathedral conducted by Sir Simon Rattle and broadcast live on BBC Television and BBC Radio 3, and more recently, in 2009, Mendelssohn's A Midsummer Night's Dream with the Orchestra of the Age of Enlightenment, also broadcast on BBC Television. In the summer of 2000 he appeared at three of the BBC's Proms including the concert to commemorate the anniversary of Bach's death which was also broadcast live on BBC Television & BBC Radio 3. He performed during 2000 in concerts as part of the Bach Cantata Pilgrimage with Sir John Eliot Gardiner and the English Baroque Soloists.

 "negotiated the concerto-like demands with graceful ease"

 "faultless circumnavigation of the sprightly bassoon part in the aria for alto and tenor"

 "accompanied by what seemed to be the quiet chuckling of divine laughter itself, in the ticklish tongueing of the bassoon"

Musical education 
In 1979, Turbett came to England to study a preliminary course in music at the Centre for Music and Performing Arts within the Colchester Institute. He went on to study bassoon, under Vernon Elliott, and clarinet at Trinity College of Music from 1981 to 1985 where he won the Dame Ruth Railton Prize for Woodwind, the David Toplis Memorial Prize for Woodwind, the Vernon Elliot Prize for Woodwind and the Grace Wylie Prize for Orchestral Playing. Turbett was awarded a postgraduate by the Worshipful Company of Musicians as a research scholar into the 17th and 18th century bassoon.

Professorships and teaching 
Turbett was appointed professor of bassoon (including historical performance) and wind chamber music at the Trinity College of Music in 2001. He has also held professorships at the Guildhall School of Music and Drama in London and at the University of Surrey and gives master classes at the Conservatoire de Paris and the Conservatoire de Lyon. Turbett is also a guest external examiner at the Royal College of Music.

As a teacher, he has worked at the Dartington International Summer School, as a wind coach for the Hampshire Youth Orchestra, as a clarinet tutor for the Essex Youth Orchestras and as a teacher of bassoon, clarinet and saxophone at the Westminster Abbey Choir School, the Benenden School, the Bexley Music School and for the Inner London Education Authority.

Chamber music

The Ebony Quartet 
Turbett is a member of the Ebony Quartet, formed in 1980 whilst the members were all studying in Colchester. The members are:
 Graeme Vinall - Clarinet, Eb Clarinet and Tenor Saxophone
 Philip Turbett - Clarinet, Alto Saxophone and Bassoon
 Trevor Barlow - Clarinet, Alto and Baritone Saxophone
 Rodney Smith - Clarinet, Bass Clarinet, Soprano, Alto and Tenor Saxophone

They gained an international reputation as a wind ensemble with unmatched versatility, encompassing music from the 16th century to contemporary works in "serious" and jazz styles. The quartet have travelled extensively throughout the British Isles playing for music societies, festivals, universities and schools. Engagements have included the Purcell Room, St. John's Smith Square and St. David's Hall Cardiff. Celebrities the quartet have performed for include the Duchess of Kent, Sir Yehudi Menuhin, David Bellamy and Joan Collins. They appeared on BBC and ITV Television, Radio 3 and Classic FM. The quartet worked for the Yehudi Menuhin "Live Music Now" scheme and performed at the International Clarinet Congresses in Paris and Ghent. They were invited by the British Council to give a series of concerts in Spain.

The Ebony Quartet have wide performing experience in educational surroundings. They give lecture recitals and master classes to young people from ages 5–20. The aim of the concerts is to introduce and demonstrate the instruments of the woodwind family through music from the 16th century to commissioned works by living composers. Their Ebony Quartet's CD "Overtones" features music from Franz Danzi to arrangements on Benny Goodman.

Orchestra management 
From 2004 to May 2009, Turbett was the orchestra manager at English National Opera where he was responsible for the day-to-day running of all aspects of the orchestral music. He is currently orchestra manager and bassoonist for English Touring Opera.

In 2006 he was appointed first ever patron to the St. Eugene's Band, Omagh; a brass and reed band in which Turbett played before he went to study in England.

References

External links 
 Philip's website
 Listen to Philip perform Venti turbini from Handel's Rinaldo with the Orchestra of the Age of Enlightenment and David Daniels (YouTube)
 Watch Philip perform BWV 179 with the English Baroque Soloists (YouTube)

Classical bassoonists from Northern Ireland
1961 births
Living people
Alumni of Trinity College of Music